Aprataxin is a protein that in humans is encoded by the APTX gene.

This gene encodes a member of the histidine triad (HIT) superfamily, some of which have nucleotide-binding and diadenosine polyphosphate hydrolase activities. The encoded protein may play a role in single-stranded DNA repair. Mutations in this gene have been associated with ataxia–ocular apraxia. Multiple transcript variants encoding distinct isoforms have been identified for this gene, however, the full length nature of some variants has not been determined.

Function 
Aprataxin removes AMP from DNA ends following abortive ligation attempts by DNA Ligase IV during non-homologous end joining, thereby permitting subsequent attempts at ligation.

DNA strand breaks
Ataxia oculomotor apraxia-1 is a neurological disorder caused by mutations in the APTX gene that encodes aprataxin.  The neurological disorder appears to be caused by the gradual accumulation of unrepaired DNA strand breaks resulting from abortive DNA ligation events.

Premature aging
Aptx−/− mutant mice have been generated, but they lack an obvious phenotype.  Another mouse model was generated in which a mutation of superoxide dismutase I (SOD1) is expressed in an Aptx−/− mouse.   The SOD1 mutation causes a reduction in transcription recovery following oxidative stress.  These mice showed accelerated cellular senescence.  This study also demonstrated a protective role of Aptx in vivo and suggested that the loss of Aptx function results in progressive accumulation of DNA breaks in the nervous system, triggering hallmarks of systemic premature aging  (see DNA damage theory of aging).

Interactions 
Aprataxin has been shown to interact with:
 PARP1,
 P53,
 XRCC1, and
 XRCC4.

References

Further reading

External links
 GeneReviews/NCBI/NIH/UW entry on Ataxia with Oculomotor Apraxia Type 1
  OMIM entries on Ataxia with Oculomotor Apraxia Type 1